Micocoulier Ecological Reserve is an ecological reserve in Quebec, Canada. It was established on January 7, 1981.

References

External links
 Official website from Government of Québec

Protected areas of Montérégie
Nature reserves in Quebec
Protected areas established in 1981
1981 establishments in Quebec
Vaudreuil-Soulanges Regional County Municipality